Kílian Jornet  (born 27 October 1987) is a Spanish professional long-distance trail runner and ski mountaineer. Widely regarded as one of the greatest trail runners of all time, he has won some of the most prestigious ultramarathons, including the Ultra-Trail du Mont-Blanc, Grand Raid, ̍Western States and ̍Hardrock.

Jornet holds the fastest known time speed record for the ascent and descent of major mountains including the Matterhorn and Mont Blanc. In addition, he holds the 24-hour uphill skiing record: 23,864-meters (78,274 ft).

Biography 

Jornet was born in Sabadell, Catalonia, Spain near Barcelona. He grew up in Refugi de Cap de Rec, a mountain hut at 2000 meters in the Pyrenees at the cross-country Lles ski resort in Lles de Cerdanya, where his father was a hut keeper and mountain guide. At the age of three he climbed Tuc de Molières, a three-thousander in the Pyrenees. By the age of five he climbed Aneto , the highest mountain in the Pyrenees, and a year later he climbed his first four-thousander, the Breithorn on the Switzerland - Italy border.

He started ski mountaineering in 1999, and competed for the first time at the La Molina race of the Spanish Cup in 2000. In 2003, he became a junior member of the Spanish national ski mountaineering team, and has raced as a senior since 2007. Jornet studied at the University of Perpignan Via Domitia.

Jornet has been recognised as an elite athlete since 2004 by the Catalan and Spanish sports councils ( and ). For his achievements in the "junior" class ski mountaineering team, he won the Catalan sports award in 2004, 2005 and 2006.

In 2005 he set a course record of 2:30:57 for the race to the  summit of the Dôme de Neige des Écrins. He was World Champion in the Buff SkyRunner World Series in 2007, 2008 and 2009 becoming the youngest athlete to win this honour.

Personal life
His sister Naila Jornet Burgada and his wife Emelie Forsberg from Sweden also compete in ski mountaineering and skyrunning events.

On 7 September 2013 Jornet and Forsberg had to be rescued by the "Peloton de Gendarmerie de haute montagne" (PGHM, alpine rescue squad) at 3,800 meters of altitude (ésperon Frendo) while attempting to climb the north face of the Aiguille du Midi in the Mont Blanc massif, wearing trail running shoes with crampons and a body stocking.

Since February 2016 Jornet and Forsberg have been living in Rauma, Norway.

Jornet and Forsberg have two children, born in March 2019 and April 2021.

"Summits of My Life" Project 

Summits of My Life was a project, trying to set ascent and descent records for some of the world's major mountains:
Kilimanjaro . On 29 September 2010, Jornet ascended and descended Kilimanjaro in a record time of 7 hours, 14 minutes. This record was broken on 13 August 2014, when the Ecuadorian mountain guide Karl Egloff ran up and down in 6 hours and 42 minutes.
Mont Blanc traverse, . In September 2012, Jornet completed the Innominata, a route linking Courmayeur and Chamonix, in 8 hours and 42 minutes. A previous attempt at ski crossing the Mont Blanc massif from Les Contamines to Champex in June 2012 resulted in the death of the French mountaineer Stéphane Brosse when a snow cornice collapsed under him.
Mont Blanc. In July 2013, Jornet achieved the fastest known time for the ascent and descent from Chamonix in 4 hours and 57 minutes.
Matterhorn, . In August 2013, Jornet achieved the fastest known time for the ascent and descent from Breuil-Cervinia in 2 hours and 52 minutes. He improved the previous fastest known time set by Bruno Brunod in 1995 by more than 20 minutes. He started climbing up the 4,478 m (14,692 ft) peak during mid-afternoon local time, reaching the summit in 1 hour 56 minutes via the Lion Ridge from the Italian side.
Denali, . In June 2014 Jornet completed the fastest known time for the ascent and descent with a time of 11 hours and 48 minutes using both skis and crampons, breaking the previous record by 5 hours and 6 minutes. Karl Eggloff broke this record by running up and down Denali in 11 hours 44 minutes, on 20 June 2019. Eggloff did not use skis during the descent.
Aconcagua, . In December 2014 Jornet set a record for climbing and descending Aconcagua from Horcones (the nearest road, at Puente del Inca) and back, in 12 hours and 49 minutes. Jornet's record was broken in February 2015, again by Karl Egloff, who completed the route in 11 hours and 52 minutes.
Elbrus, . Jornet made an attempt in 2013 to set the fastest known time for the ascent and descent from Azau but was forced to turn back by bad weather. The fastest known time for the ascent is 3:23:37 set in 2010 by Andrzej Bargiel, while the record time for ascent and descent is 4:20:45, set on 7 May 2017 by Karl Egloff.
Mount Everest, . Jornet  summited Mount Everest at midnight (local time) on 22 May 2017. Climbing without supplemental oxygen, he reached the top in 26 hours from base camp. On 27 May he reached the summit again from advanced base camp in 17 hours, about 15–20 minutes slower than the records from this camp set by Hans Kammerlander and Christian Stangl in 1996 and 2006, respectively.

Selected results

Mountain running / skyrunning 
 2005:
 1st, and 2nd in the combined ranking at the "Cuita al Sol" race (in Spain) 
 1st, and course record, Dôme de Neige des Écrins (in France)
 2nd, "Cross Vertical", in Andorra
 2nd, Prueba de Copa de España“ race, Buff-Salomon Vallnord
 2006:
 1st International Championship team race, SkyGames (FSA)
 1st, French Championships of Mountainrunning, "junior" class race, FFA
 6th, World Championship of Skyrunning
 2007:
 Champion of the year and four times 1st, Skyrunner World Series
 1st, Mount Ontake Skyrace (in Japan)
 2nd, Orobie Skyrace team race (in Italy) together with Jordi Martin Pascual and Xavier Zapater Bargue
 2008:
 Champion of the year and three times 1st, Skyrunner World Series
 1st, Ultra-Trail du Mont-Blanc
2009:
 Champion, Skyrunner World Series
 1st, 23rd Mt. Kinabalu Climbathon (in Borneo - Malaysia)
 1st, Ultra Trail Andorra 
 1st, Ultra-Trail du Mont-Blanc
 1st, Sierre-Zinal, Switzerland
2010:
 3rd, Western States Endurance Run, California, USA
 1st, Sierre-Zinal, Switzerland
 1st, Grand Raid de la Réunion
2011:
 1st, The North Face 100, Blue Mountains, Australia. Course Record
 1st, Western States Endurance Run, California, USA
 1st, Ultra-Trail du Mont-Blanc
2012:
 1st, 26th Mt. Kinabalu Climbathon in Borneo, Malaysia (2:11:45)
 1st, Pikes Peak Marathon, Colorado, USA.
 1st, Grand Raid de la Réunion
2013:
 1st, Transvulcania, Spain
 1st, Zegama-Aizkorri, Spain
 1st, Marathon du Mont Blanc, France
 1st, Ice Trail Tarantaise, France
 1st, Dolomites Vertical Kilometer, Italy
 1st, Dolomites SkyRace, Italy
 1st, Trans D'Havet, Italy
 1st, Matterhorn Ultraks, Switzerland 
 1st, Limone SkyRace Extreme, Italy
 Then World Record, Mount Kilimanjaro Ascent and combined Ascent/Descent (5:23:50, 7:14:00)
2014:
 2nd, Transvulcania, Spain
 1st, Zegama-Aizkorri, Spain
 1st, Hardrock Hundred Mile Endurance Run, Colorado, USA.  Course Record clockwise
 1st, Marathon du Mont Blanc, Skyrunner World Championship, France
 1st, Vertical Kilometer race, Skyrunner World Championship, France
 1st, Sierre-Zinal, Switzerland
 1st, Trofeo Kima, Italy
2015
 1st, Mount Marathon Race, Alaska, USA.  Then Course Record
 1st, Hardrock Hundred Mile Endurance Run, Colorado, USA.  Course Record counter-clockwise
 1st, Ultra Pirineu, Bagà, Spain. Course Record
 1st, Sierre-Zinal, Switzerland
2016
 1st, Zegama-Aizkorri, Spain (8th victory)
 1st, Hardrock Hundred Mile Endurance Run, Colorado, USA.  Tie with Jason Schlarb (USA)
 2017
 1st, Marathon du Mont Blanc, France
 1st, Hardrock Hundred Mile Endurance Run, Colorado, USA
 1st, Sierre-Zinal, Switzerland
 2nd, Ultra-Trail du Mont-Blanc
 1st, Salomon Glen Coe Skyline, Scotland (course record)
 2018
 1st, Marathon du Mont Blanc, France
 1st, Trofeo Kima, Italy
 Fastest Known Time, Bob Graham Round, Lake District, England
1st, Sierre-Zinal, Switzerland
 2019
 1st, Zegama-Aizkorri, Spain
 1st, Sierre-Zinal, Switzerland. New record on the course 2.25h
 1st, Pikes Peak Marathon, Colorado, USA.
 1st, The Finale Annapurna Trail Marathon, Nepal
 2021
 Vertical Kilometer Fastest Known Time 28'48'04 
 2022
 1st, Zegama-Aizkorri, Spain
 1st, Hardrock Hundred Mile Endurance Run, Colorado, USA. New Course Record clockwise in 21:36:24
 5th, Sierre-Zinal, Switzerland
 1st, Ultra-Trail du Mont-Blanc New Course Record in 19:49:30

Climbing 
 2006: 2nd, International Championship SkySpeed Climb

Duathlon 
 2006:
 1st Llívia duathlon race
 1st Núria  duathlon race
 2007:
 1st Núria-Queralbs Salomon Compex, "senior" class

Ski mountaineering 
 2002:
 2nd, Spanish Championship team race together with Gil Erra, "cadet" class
 4th, Spanish Cup, "cadet" class
 5th, Spanish Championship single race, "cadet" class
 2003:
 1st, Spanish Championship team race together with  Jaume Guàrdia
 2004:
 1st, World Championship vertical race, "cadet" class
 1st, Spanish Championship single race, "cadet" class
 1st, Spanish Championship vertical race, "cadet" class
 1st, Spanish Championship vertical race together with Aleix Pubill Rodríguez, "cadet" class
 2nd, World Championship single race, "cadet" class
 3rd, European Cup single race, "cadet" class
 2005:
 1st, European Championship vertical race, "cadet" class
 1st, Spanish Championship single race, "cadet" class
 1st, Spanish Cup single race, "cadet" class
 1st, European Cup single race, "cadet" class
 1st, Spanish Championship team race together with Jordi Oliva
 3rd, Spanish Championship vertical race
 4th, Spanish Cup single race, "cadet" class
 2007:
 1st, European Championship single race, "junior" class
 1st, European Championship vertical race, "junior" class
 1st, European Championship relay race together with Mireia Miró Varela and Marc Pinsach Rubirola, "junior" class
 1st, European Championship team race, "junior" class
 1st, 20th "Traça Catalana"
 2nd, Spanish Cup vertical race
 2008:
 1st, World Cup race in Valerette
 1st, World Cup race in Massongex
 3rd, World Championship long distance race
 3rd, World Championship relay race together with Javier Martín de Villa, Manuel Pérez Brunicardi and Marc Solá Pastoret
 4th, World Championship vertical race
 4th, World Cup single race in the Aran Valley 
 2009:
 1st, European Championship vertical race
 2nd, European Championship relay race together with Javier Martín de Villa, Joan Maria Vendrell Martínez and Manuel Pérez Brunicardi
 5th, European Championship team race together with Javier Martín de Villa
 2010:
 1st, World Championship vertical race
 2nd, World Championship single race
 3rd, World Championship combination ranking
 4th, World Championship relay race (together with Javier Martín de Villa, Manuel Pérez Brunicardi and Marc Pinsach Rubirola)
 8th, World Championship team race (together with Marc Pinsach Rubirola)
 1st (espoirs), Trophée des Gastlosen (ISMF World Cup), together with Marc Pinsach Rubirola
 2011:
 1st, World Championship single race
 1st, World Championship vertical race
 1st, World Championship vertical, combined ranking
 4th, World Championship relay, together with Marc Pinsach Rubirola, Miguel Caballero Ortega, Javier Martín de Villa
 8th, World Championship team race (together with Marc Pinsach Rubirola)
 1st, Mountain Attack
 2012:
 1st, European Championship vertical race
 1st, World Championship vertical, combined ranking
 2nd, European Championship single
 4th, European Championship relay, together with Marc Pinsach Rubirola, Marc Solà Pastoret and Miguel Caballero Ortega
 5th, European Championship team, together with Marc Pinsach Rubirola
 1st and course record, Mountain Attack
 1st, Patrouille de la Maya, together with Valentin Favre and Alexis Sévennec-Verdier

Pierra Menta 

 2008: 1st  together with Florent Troillet
 2010: 1st  together with Florent Troillet
 2011: 1st  together with Didier Blanc
 2012: 7th together with Marc Pinsach Rubirola
 2016: 1st  together with Matheo Jacquemoud
 2017: 2nd together with Alexis Sevennec
 2022: 3rd together with Jakob Herrmann

Patrouille des Glaciers 

 2010: 4th together with Marc Solà Pastoret and Marc Pinsach Rubirola
 2012: 1st together with William Bon Mardion and Mathéo Jacquemoud

Trofeo Mezzalama 

 2011: 1st together with William Bon Mardion and Didier Blanc
 2013: 2nd together with William Bon Mardion and Mathéo Jacquemoud
 2017: 2nd together with Martin Anthamatten and Werner Marti
 2019: 3rd together with Jakob Herrmann and Armin Höfl

Summit list

List of mountains summited:
Mont Blanc, 2012 
Matterhorn, August 2013
Denali, 2014
Aconcagua, December 2014
Cho Oyu, 2017
Mount Everest (twice), 2017

Filmography
 Summits of my life – A Fine Line (2012) was presented in the Palau de la Música Catalana de Barcelona and shows Jornet accompanied by his mother, sister, his first trainer, and his friends, like Stéphane Brosse, Mireia Miró Varela, Vivian Bruchez, Mattéo Jacquemoud, Jordi Tosas and Anna Frost.
 Summits of my life - Déjame Vivir (2014) was released online in 2014. It shows Jornets activities during 2013, the Mont Blanc running record in July, his speed record on the Matterhorn in August and his run on Mount Elbrus in mid-September.
 Summits of my life - Langtang (2015)
 Summits of my life - Path to Everest (2018)

Bibliography

References

External links 
 
 Kilian Jornet at Skimountaineering.org

1987 births
Living people
Spanish male long-distance runners
Spanish male ski mountaineers
Sportspeople from Sabadell
World ski mountaineering champions
Duathletes
Spanish ultramarathon runners
Male ultramarathon runners
Spanish sky runners
Skyrunning World Championships winners
Ski mountaineers from Catalonia
Spanish summiters of Mount Everest
Spanish mountain climbers